Levoyer is a French surname. Notable people with the surname include:

 Alain Levoyer (1940–2017), French property lawyer and politician
 Richelieu Levoyer (1930–2015), Ecuadorian military officer and politician

French-language surnames